A Williamite was a follower of King William III of England (r. 1689–1702) who deposed King James II and VII in the Glorious Revolution. William, the Stadtholder of the Dutch Republic, replaced James with the support of English Whigs.

One of William's aims was to ensure England's entry into his League of Augsburg against France in the Nine Years' War. For Williamites in England, Scotland and Ireland, William was seen as the guarantor of civil and religious liberty and the Protestant monarchy against Catholic absolutism.

The term "Williamite" is also commonly used to refer to William's multi-national army in Ireland during the Williamite War in Ireland, 1689–1691. In Ireland itself, William was primarily supported by Protestants and opposed by the native and Anglo-Irish Catholic Jacobites who supported James. Once James II had come to the throne in 1685, he had his viceroy Richard Talbot, Earl of Tyrconnell replace Protestants with Catholics in the government. The Royal Irish Army was purged of Protestants, who were replaced by Catholic officers and soldiers. The Irish Militia was disarmed and its weapons issued to Catholics.

In response in 1689 Irish Protestants formed their own Army of the North, proclaimed William of Orange to be King, and began seizing strongholds around Cork and particularly in Ulster. However the Jacobite Irish Army was able to re-establish control, taking Bandon and routing the Army of the North during the Break of Dromore. Before long only Derry and Enniskillen still held out.

After these early setbacks, Williamite forces won a series of victories during the war, defending Derry and capturing Carrickfergus in 1689. Subsequent battles at the Boyne and Aughrim led to a decisive victory at Limerick by 1691. William himself led his forces at the Boyne in 1690, which was widely commemorated in paintings such as Benjamin West's The Battle of the Boyne. He is still depicted in the iconography of the Orange Order, whose name comes from William's dynasty, the House of Orange-Nassau.

"Williamite" is sometimes applied to Late Stuart country house architecture built c. 1690–1710 in the conservative classicising English tradition that had been established under Charles II by Hugh May and Sir Christopher Wren, of which Belton House, Lincolnshire, and, formerly Stoke Edith, Herefordshire are typical examples. Such compact houses do not fit easily within the conventions of English baroque architecture.

The "Williamite Purple Star" is still part of the flag of the Orange Order in Northern Ireland.

Notes

Sources
J.G. Simms, Jacobite Ireland, London 1969

Williamite War in Ireland
Jacobite rising of 1689
Stuart England
Monarchism in the United Kingdom
William III of England